Lawrence College Ghora Gali is a school situated in Murree Tehsil, Punjab, Pakistan. It is 4 km from Murree and 57 km from Rawalpindi/Islamabad.

History
The college was founded in 1860 for the orphans of British soldiers and was named after Sir Henry Montgomery Lawrence.

Notable alumni

 Gen. Shamim Alam Khan
 Lt. Gen. Imran Ullah Khan
 V/Adm. Kaleem Shaukat
 Shahid Khaqan Abbasi, former Prime Minister of Pakistan
 Mumtaz Bhutto 
 Sarfraz Bugti
 Zafarullah Khan Jamali, former Prime Minister Of Pakistan
 Raja Muhammad Zulqarnain Khan, former President of Azad Kashmir
 Aftab Ahmad Khan Sherpao
 Ayaz Amir
 Ismail Gulgee
 Ikram Sehgal
 Reginald Dyer
 Usman Ali Isani, educationist

See also
Army Burn Hall College
Lawrence Military Asylums
Lawrence School, Sanawar
Lawrence School, Lovedale

References

External links
Lawrence College Official website
 The Magic Mountains: Hill Stations and the British Raj
Old Gallians Database

Pakistan Army
Boarding schools in Pakistan
Universities and colleges in Murree
Education in Murree
Buildings and structures in Murree
Schools in Murree